Aguila Saleh Issa (born January 11, 1944) is a Libyan jurist and politician who is the Speaker of the Libyan House of Representatives since 5 August 2014. He is also a representative of the town of Al Qubbah, in the east of the country.

Biography 
Aguila Saleh Issa was born on January 11, 1944, in the town of Al Qubbah, Libya.

Following the 2014 Libyan Parliamentary election, Aguila Saleh Issa was elected as parliament speaker, but was forced to flee to Tobruk along with the rest of the Libyan House of Representatives after Tripoli was seized by militias.

On February 20, 2015, Aguila Saleh Issa's residence was the target of bombing by ISIL militants in the town of Al Qubbah. In what became known as Al Qubbah bombings, bombs also targeted a petrol station and a police station. It was one of the deadliest attacks in Libya since the end of the 2011 civil war, resulting in a total of at least 40 people killed, although it was not clear how many died in the attack on his residence. ISIL said that the attacks were carried out in retaliation for the 2015 Egyptian military intervention in Libya.

On September 20th, 2021, Saleh announced his intention to temporarily withdraw from parliament in order to run as a candidate for president in the 2021 Libyan general election.

References

1944 births
Heads of state of Libya
Living people
People from Derna District
Members of the House of Representatives (Libya)
21st-century Libyan politicians